Lisa Raymond and Samantha Stosur defeated Cara Black and Rennae Stubbs in the final, 6–7(5–7), 7–5, 6–4 to win the doubles tennis title at the 2005 WTA Tour Championships.

Nadia Petrova and Meghann Shaughnessy were the reigning champions, but did not qualify this year.

This marked the final professional appearance for 1994 Wimbledon champion Conchita Martínez before her retirement in 2006. Partnering Virginia Ruano Pascual, she was defeated by Raymond and Stosur in the semifinals.

Seeds
 Cara Black /  Rennae Stubbs (final)
 Lisa Raymond /  Samantha Stosur (champions)

Draw

Finals

Doubles
WTA Tour
2005 WTA Tour